In Greek mythology, Pyrene (Ancient Greek: Πυρήνη) may refer to:

 Pyrene, daughter of King Bebrycius and a lover (or victim, depending on the myth) of Heracles. She bore a serpent and became so terrified that she fled to the woods where she died. Heracles created a tomb for her by piling up rocks thus forming the mountain range of the Pyrenees, named after her.
 Pyrene, also called Pelopia, mother of Cycnus with Ares.

Notes

References 

 Apollodorus, The Library with an English Translation by Sir James George Frazer, F.B.A., F.R.S. in 2 Volumes, Cambridge, MA, Harvard University Press; London, William Heinemann Ltd. 1921. ISBN 0-674-99135-4. Online version at the Perseus Digital Library. Greek text available from the same website.

Nymphs
Women of Ares
Women of Heracles
Pyrenees